Mars Loves Venus EP is the debut release by the Brunettes. It was self-released in 1998, on lathe-cut clear vinyl manufactured by King Records in Geraldine, New Zealand. Only 30 copies are believed to be in existence, and the EP is highly sought after by collectors. The version of the title track is different from the one which appears on the Mars Loves Venus album.

Track listing
 "Mars Loves Venus"
 "Long Distance Love"
 "He's a Teenwolf"
 "Lookout for the Shutterbug"

Personnel
 Jonathan Bree — vocals, guitar
 Heather Mansfield — vocals, keyboards
 Marcus Sellwood — bass
 Andy Baxter — drums

External links
Lil' Chief Records: The Brunettes
Lil' Chief Records
The Brunettes on Myspace

1998 debut EPs
The Brunettes albums